Monte Guilarte, also known as Monte del Guaraguao, is the fifth-highest peak in Puerto Rico at  above sea level. The mountain is located in the Cordillera Central, in the municipality of Adjuntas.

It is so named after Captain Juan Guilarte de Salazar, a Spanish explorer and Conquistador, who was one of the first settlers of Puerto Rico. In 1513, Guilarte de Salazar led a column of 50 men to victory against 600 Taíno Indians in the southwest of the island.

The mountain and its surroundings encompasses the Guilarte State Forest, located in Guilarte, Adjuntas, Puerto Rico.

References

External links

 Montañas de Puerto Rico on Proyecto Salon Hogar

Mountains of Puerto Rico
Mountains of the Caribbean
Adjuntas, Puerto Rico
Geography of Puerto Rico